Minutes is an album by British singer Elkie Brooks.

Background 
Minutes was Brooks' first contemporary album since Live and Learn in 1979. A&M wanted her to stick to the winning formula of the Pearls albums, but Brooks had other ideas. She hired the producer and band to create what was an experimental album for the time, a mixture of pop tunes and dark 1980s rock. A&M had little faith in the album and withheld promotion, focusing on her forthcoming album, the more commercial Screen Gems.

Two singles were released but sold poorly. Brooks went on tour to increase sales, but by the time the tour began, A&M was ready to release her next album.

Track listing 
All tracks composed by Elkie Brooks and Duncan Mackay except where indicated
 "Minutes" (Mackay, Hill, Brooks, Zal Cleminson)
 "Driftin'" (Bruce Woolley, Simon Darlow)
 "Night Run" (Mackay, Brooks, Zal Cleminson)
 "Take Your Freedom"
 "Growing Tired"
 "Born Lucky" (Mackay, Jo Partridge)
 "I've Been in Love Before"
 "Too Heavy, Too Strong"
 "Cross Fire" (Mackay, Brooks, Zal Cleminson)
 "Work Play"

Personnel 
Elkie Brooks – vocals
Duncan Mackay – piano, keyboards, arrangements
Zal Cleminson – guitars, backing vocals
John Giblin – bass guitar, backing vocals
Graham Jarvis – drums
Duncan Kinnell - percussion
London Philharmonic Orchestra - orchestra on "Minutes" and "Growing Tired"
Richard Hill - orchestral arrangements on "Minutes" and "Growing Tired"
Technical
John Etchells - engineer
Richard Haughton - cover photography

1984 albums
A&M Records albums
Elkie Brooks albums